The Cretaceous–Paleogene (K–Pg) extinction event, also known as the Cretaceous–Tertiary  extinction, was a sudden mass extinction of three-quarters of the plant and animal species on Earth, approximately 66 million years ago. The event caused the extinction of all non-avian dinosaurs. Most other tetrapods weighing more than  also became extinct, with the exception of some ectothermic species such as sea turtles and crocodilians. It marked the end of the Cretaceous Period, and with it the Mesozoic era, while heralding the beginning of the Cenozoic era, which continues to this day.

In the geologic record, the K–Pg event is marked by a thin layer of sediment called the K–Pg boundary, which can be found throughout the world in marine and terrestrial rocks. The boundary clay shows unusually high levels of the metal iridium, which is more common in asteroids than in the Earth's crust.

As originally proposed in 1980 by a team of scientists led by Luis Alvarez and his son Walter, it is now generally thought that the K–Pg extinction was caused by the impact of a massive asteroid , 66 million years ago, which devastated the global environment, mainly through a lingering impact winter which halted photosynthesis in plants and plankton. The impact hypothesis, also known as the Alvarez hypothesis, was bolstered by the discovery of the  Chicxulub crater in the Gulf of Mexico's Yucatán Peninsula in the early 1990s, which provided conclusive evidence that the K–Pg boundary clay represented debris from an asteroid impact. The fact that the extinctions occurred simultaneously provides strong evidence that they were caused by the asteroid. A 2016 drilling project into the Chicxulub peak ring confirmed that the peak ring comprised granite ejected within minutes from deep in the earth, but contained hardly any gypsum, the usual sulfate-containing sea floor rock in the region: the gypsum would have vaporized and dispersed as an aerosol into the atmosphere, causing longer-term effects on the climate and food chain. In October 2019, researchers reported that the event rapidly acidified the oceans, producing ecological collapse and, in this way as well, produced long-lasting effects on the climate, and accordingly was a key reason for the mass extinction at the end of the Cretaceous. 

Other causal or contributing factors to the extinction may have been the Deccan Traps and other volcanic eruptions, climate change, and sea level change. However, in January 2020, scientists reported that climate-modeling of the extinction event favored the asteroid impact and not volcanism.

A wide range of terrestrial species perished in the K–Pg extinction, the best-known being the non-avian dinosaurs, along with many mammals, birds, lizards, insects, plants, and all the pterosaurs. In the oceans, the K–Pg extinction killed off plesiosaurs and mosasaurs and devastated teleost fish, sharks, mollusks (especially ammonites, which became extinct), and many species of plankton. It is estimated that 75% or more of all species on Earth vanished. Yet the extinction also provided evolutionary opportunities: in its wake, many groups underwent remarkable adaptive radiation—sudden and prolific divergence into new forms and species within the disrupted and emptied ecological niches. Mammals in particular diversified in the Paleogene, evolving new forms such as horses, whales, bats, and primates. The surviving group of dinosaurs were avians, a few species of ground and water fowl, which radiated into all modern species of birds. Among other groups, teleost fish and perhaps lizards also radiated.

Extinction patterns
 The K–Pg extinction event was severe, global, rapid, and selective, eliminating a vast number of species. Based on marine fossils, it is estimated that 75% or more of all species were made extinct.

The event appears to have affected all continents at the same time. Non-avian dinosaurs, for example, are known from the Maastrichtian of North America, Europe, Asia, Africa, South America, and Antarctica, but are unknown from the Cenozoic anywhere in the world. Similarly, fossil pollen shows devastation of the plant communities in areas as far apart as New Mexico, Alaska, China, and New Zealand.

Despite the event's severity, there was significant variability in the rate of extinction between and within different clades. Species that depended on photosynthesis declined or became extinct as atmospheric particles blocked sunlight and reduced the solar energy reaching the ground. This plant extinction caused a major reshuffling of the dominant plant groups. Omnivores, insectivores, and carrion-eaters survived the extinction event, perhaps because of the increased availability of their food sources. No purely herbivorous or carnivorous mammals seem to have survived. Rather, the surviving mammals and birds fed on insects, worms, and snails, which in turn fed on detritus (dead plant and animal matter).

In stream communities, few animal groups became extinct, because such communities rely less directly on food from living plants, and more on detritus washed in from the land, protecting them from extinction. Similar, but more complex patterns have been found in the oceans. Extinction was more severe among animals living in the water column than among animals living on or in the sea floor. Animals in the water column are almost entirely dependent on primary production from living phytoplankton, while animals on the ocean floor always or sometimes feed on detritus. Coccolithophorids and mollusks (including ammonites, rudists, freshwater snails, and mussels), and those organisms whose food chain included these shell builders, became extinct or suffered heavy losses. For example, it is thought that ammonites were the principal food of mosasaurs, a group of giant marine reptiles that became extinct at the boundary. The largest air-breathing survivors of the event, crocodyliforms and champsosaurs, were semi-aquatic and had access to detritus. Modern crocodilians can live as scavengers and survive for months without food, and their young are small, grow slowly, and feed largely on invertebrates and dead organisms for their first few years. These characteristics have been linked to crocodilian survival at the end of the Cretaceous.

After the K–Pg extinction event, biodiversity required substantial time to recover, despite the existence of abundant vacant ecological niches.

Microbiota
The K–Pg boundary represents one of the most dramatic turnovers in the fossil record for various calcareous nanoplankton that formed the calcium deposits for which the Cretaceous is named. The turnover in this group is clearly marked at the species level. Statistical analysis of marine losses at this time suggests that the decrease in diversity was caused more by a sharp increase in extinctions than by a decrease in speciation. The K–Pg boundary record of dinoflagellates is not so well understood, mainly because only microbial cysts provide a fossil record, and not all dinoflagellate species have cyst-forming stages, which likely causes diversity to be underestimated. Recent studies indicate that there were no major shifts in dinoflagellates through the boundary layer.

Radiolaria have left a geological record since at least the Ordovician times, and their mineral fossil skeletons can be tracked across the K–Pg boundary. There is no evidence of mass extinction of these organisms, and there is support for high productivity of these species in southern high latitudes as a result of cooling temperatures in the early Paleocene. Approximately 46% of diatom species survived the transition from the Cretaceous to the Upper Paleocene, a significant turnover in species but not a catastrophic extinction.

The occurrence of planktonic foraminifera across the K–Pg boundary has been studied since the 1930s. Research spurred by the possibility of an impact event at the K–Pg boundary resulted in numerous publications detailing planktonic foraminiferal extinction at the boundary; there is ongoing debate between groups which think the evidence indicates substantial extinction of these species at the K–Pg boundary, and those who think the evidence supports multiple extinctions and expansions through the boundary.

Numerous species of benthic foraminifera became extinct during the event, presumably because they depend on organic debris for nutrients, while biomass in the ocean is thought to have decreased. As the marine microbiota recovered, it is thought that increased speciation of benthic foraminifera resulted from the increase in food sources. Phytoplankton recovery in the early Paleocene provided the food source to support large benthic foraminiferal assemblages, which are mainly detritus-feeding. Ultimate recovery of the benthic populations occurred over several stages lasting several hundred thousand years into the early Paleocene.

Marine invertebrates 

There is significant variation in the fossil record as to the extinction rate of marine invertebrates across the K–Pg boundary. The apparent rate is influenced by a lack of fossil records, rather than extinctions.

Ostracods, a class of small crustaceans that were prevalent in the upper Maastrichtian, left fossil deposits in a variety of locations. A review of these fossils shows that ostracod diversity was lower in the Paleocene than any other time in the Cenozoic. Current research cannot ascertain whether the extinctions occurred prior to, or during, the boundary interval.

Approximately 60% of late-Cretaceous Scleractinia coral genera failed to cross the K–Pg boundary into the Paleocene. Further analysis of the coral extinctions shows that approximately 98% of colonial species, ones that inhabit warm, shallow tropical waters, became extinct. The solitary corals, which generally do not form reefs and inhabit colder and deeper (below the photic zone) areas of the ocean were less impacted by the K–Pg boundary. Colonial coral species rely upon symbiosis with photosynthetic algae, which collapsed due to the events surrounding the K–Pg boundary, but the use of data from coral fossils to support K–Pg extinction and subsequent Paleocene recovery, must be weighed against the changes that occurred in coral ecosystems through the K–Pg boundary.

The numbers of cephalopod, echinoderm, and bivalve genera exhibited significant diminution after the K–Pg boundary. Most species of brachiopods, a small phylum of marine invertebrates, survived the K–Pg extinction event and diversified during the early Paleocene.

Except for nautiloids (represented by the modern order Nautilida) and coleoids (which had already diverged into modern octopodes, squids, and cuttlefish) all other species of the molluscan class Cephalopoda became extinct at the K–Pg boundary. These included the ecologically significant belemnoids, as well as the ammonoids, a group of highly diverse, numerous, and widely distributed shelled cephalopods. Researchers have pointed out that the reproductive strategy of the surviving nautiloids, which rely upon few and larger eggs, played a role in outsurviving their ammonoid counterparts through the extinction event. The ammonoids utilized a planktonic strategy of reproduction (numerous eggs and planktonic larvae), which would have been devastated by the K–Pg extinction event. Additional research has shown that subsequent to this elimination of ammonoids from the global biota, nautiloids began an evolutionary radiation into shell shapes and complexities theretofore known only from ammonoids.

Approximately 35% of echinoderm genera became extinct at the K–Pg boundary, although taxa that thrived in low-latitude, shallow-water environments during the late Cretaceous had the highest extinction rate. Mid-latitude, deep-water echinoderms were much less affected at the K–Pg boundary. The pattern of extinction points to habitat loss, specifically the drowning of carbonate platforms, the shallow-water reefs in existence at that time, by the extinction event.

Other invertebrate groups, including rudists (reef-building clams) and inoceramids (giant relatives of modern scallops), also became extinct at the K–Pg boundary.

Fish
There are fossil records of jawed fishes across the K–Pg boundary, which provide good evidence of extinction patterns of these classes of marine vertebrates. While the deep-sea realm was able to remain seemingly unaffected, there was an equal loss between the open marine apex predators and the durophagous demersal feeders on the continental shelf. Within cartilaginous fish, approximately 7 out of the 41 families of neoselachians (modern sharks, skates, and rays) disappeared after this event and batoids (skates and rays) lost nearly all the identifiable species, while more than 90% of teleost fish (bony fish) families survived.

In the Maastrichtian age, 28 shark families and 13 batoid families thrived, of which 25 and 9, respectively, survived the K–T boundary event. Forty-seven of all neoselachian genera cross the K–T boundary, with 85% being sharks. Batoids display with 15%, a comparably low survival rate.

There is evidence of a mass extinction of bony fishes at a fossil site immediately above the K–Pg boundary layer on Seymour Island near Antarctica, apparently precipitated by the K–Pg extinction event; the marine and freshwater environments of fishes mitigated the environmental effects of the extinction event.

Terrestrial invertebrates
Insect damage to the fossilized leaves of flowering plants from fourteen sites in North America was used as a proxy for insect diversity across the K–Pg boundary and analyzed to determine the rate of extinction. Researchers found that Cretaceous sites, prior to the extinction event, had rich plant and insect-feeding diversity. During the early Paleocene, flora were relatively diverse with little predation from insects, even 1.7 million years after the extinction event.

Terrestrial plants
There is overwhelming evidence of global disruption of plant communities at the K–Pg boundary. Extinctions are seen both in studies of fossil pollen, and fossil leaves. In North America, the data suggests massive devastation and mass extinction of plants at the K–Pg boundary sections, although there were substantial megafloral changes before the boundary. In North America, approximately 57% of plant species became extinct. In high southern hemisphere latitudes, such as New Zealand and Antarctica, the mass die-off of flora caused no significant turnover in species, but dramatic and short-term changes in the relative abundance of plant groups. In some regions, the Paleocene recovery of plants began with recolonizations by fern species, represented as a fern spike in the geologic record; this same pattern of fern recolonization was observed after the 1980 Mount St. Helens eruption.

Due to the wholesale destruction of plants at the K–Pg boundary, there was a proliferation of saprotrophic organisms, such as fungi, that do not require photosynthesis and use nutrients from decaying vegetation. The dominance of fungal species lasted only a few years while the atmosphere cleared and plenty of organic matter to feed on was present. Once the atmosphere cleared, photosynthetic organisms, initially ferns and other ground-level plants, returned. Just two species of fern appear to have dominated the landscape for centuries after the event.

Polyploidy appears to have enhanced the ability of flowering plants to survive the extinction, probably because the additional copies of the genome such plants possessed allowed them to more readily adapt to the rapidly changing environmental conditions that followed the impact.

Fungi
While it appears that many fungi were wiped out at the K-Pg boundary, it is worth noting that evidence has been found indicating that some fungal species thrived in the years after the extinction event. Microfossils from that period indicate a great increase in fungal spores, long before the resumption of plentiful fern spores in the recovery after the impact. Monoporisporites and hypha are almost exclusive microfossils for a short span during and after the iridium boundary. These saprophytes would not need sunlight, allowing them to survive during a period when the atmosphere was likely clogged with dust and sulfur aerosols.

The proliferation of fungi has occurred after several extinction events, including the Permian–Triassic extinction event, the largest known mass extinction in Earth's history, with up to 96% of all species suffering extinction.

Amphibians 
There is limited evidence for extinction of amphibians at the K–Pg boundary. A study of fossil vertebrates across the K–Pg boundary in Montana concluded that no species of amphibian became extinct. Yet there are several species of Maastrichtian amphibian, not included as part of this study, which are unknown from the Paleocene. These include the frog Theatonius lancensis and the albanerpetontid Albanerpeton galaktion; therefore, some amphibians do seem to have become extinct at the boundary. The relatively low levels of extinction seen among amphibians probably reflect the low extinction rates seen in freshwater animals.

Non-archosaurs

Turtles
More than 80% of Cretaceous turtle species passed through the K–Pg boundary. All six turtle families in existence at the end of the Cretaceous survived into the Paleogene and are represented by living species.

Lepidosauria
The living non-archosaurian reptile taxa, lepidosaurians (snakes, lizards and tuataras), survived across the K–Pg boundary.

The rhynchocephalians were a widespread and relatively successful group of lepidosaurians during the early Mesozoic, but began to decline by the mid-Cretaceous, although they were very successful in South America. They are represented today by a single genus (the Tuatara), located exclusively in New Zealand.

The order Squamata, which is represented today by lizards, snakes and amphisbaenians (worm lizards), radiated into various ecological niches during the Jurassic and was successful throughout the Cretaceous. They survived through the K–Pg boundary and are currently the most successful and diverse group of living reptiles, with more than 6,000 extant species. Many families of terrestrial squamates became extinct at the boundary, such as monstersaurians and polyglyphanodonts, and fossil evidence indicates they suffered very heavy losses in the K–Pg event, only recovering 10 million years after it.

Non-archosaurian marine reptiles
Giant non-archosaurian aquatic reptiles such as mosasaurs and plesiosaurs, which were the top marine predators of their time, became extinct by the end of the Cretaceous. The ichthyosaurs had disappeared from fossil records before the mass extinction occurred.

Archosaurs
The archosaur clade includes two surviving groups, crocodilians and birds, along with the various extinct groups of non-avian dinosaurs and pterosaurs.

Crocodyliforms

Ten families of crocodilians or their close relatives are represented in the Maastrichtian fossil records, of which five died out prior to the K–Pg boundary. Five families have both Maastrichtian and Paleocene fossil representatives. All of the surviving families of crocodyliforms inhabited freshwater and terrestrial environments—except for the Dyrosauridae, which lived in freshwater and marine locations. Approximately 50% of crocodyliform representatives survived across the K–Pg boundary, the only apparent trend being that no large crocodiles survived. Crocodyliform survivability across the boundary may have resulted from their aquatic niche and ability to burrow, which reduced susceptibility to negative environmental effects at the boundary. Jouve and colleagues suggested in 2008 that juvenile marine crocodyliforms lived in freshwater environments as do modern marine crocodile juveniles, which would have helped them survive where other marine reptiles became extinct; freshwater environments were not so strongly affected by the K–Pg extinction event as marine environments were.

Pterosaurs
Two families of pterosaurs, Azhdarchidae and Nyctosauridae, were definitely present in the Maastrichtian, and they likely became extinct at the K–Pg boundary. Several other pterosaur lineages may have been present during the Maastrichtian, such as the ornithocheirids, pteranodontids, a possible tapejarid, a possible thalassodromid and a basal toothed taxon of uncertain affinities, though they are represented by fragmentary remains that are difficult to assign to any given group. While this was occurring, modern birds were undergoing diversification; traditionally it was thought that they replaced archaic birds and pterosaur groups, possibly due to direct competition, or they simply filled empty niches, but there is no correlation between pterosaur and avian diversities that are conclusive to a competition hypothesis, and small pterosaurs were present in the Late Cretaceous. At least some niches previously held by birds were reclaimed by pterosaurs prior to the K–Pg event.

Birds
Most paleontologists regard birds as the only surviving dinosaurs (see Origin of birds). It is thought that all non-avian theropods became extinct, including then-flourishing groups such as enantiornithines and hesperornithiforms. Several analyses of bird fossils show divergence of species prior to the K–Pg boundary, and that duck, chicken, and ratite bird relatives coexisted with non-avian dinosaurs. Large collections of bird fossils representing a range of different species provide definitive evidence for the persistence of archaic birds to within 300,000 years of the K–Pg boundary. The absence of these birds in the Paleogene is evidence that a mass extinction of archaic birds took place there.

The most successful and dominant group of avialans, enantiornithes, were wiped out. Only a small fraction of ground and water-dwelling Cretaceous bird species survived the impact, giving rise to today's birds. The only bird group known for certain to have survived the K–Pg boundary is the Aves. Avians may have been able to survive the extinction as a result of their abilities to dive, swim, or seek shelter in water and marshlands. Many species of avians can build burrows, or nest in tree holes, or termite nests, all of which provided shelter from the environmental effects at the K–Pg boundary. Long-term survival past the boundary was assured as a result of filling ecological niches left empty by extinction of non-avian dinosaurs. The open niche space and relative scarcity of predators following the K-Pg extinction allowed for adaptive radiation of various avian groups. Ratites, for example, rapidly diversified in the early Paleogene and are believed to have convergently developed flightlessness at least three to six times, often fulfilling the niche space for large herbivores once occupied by non-avian dinosaurs.

Non-avian dinosaurs

Excluding a few controversial claims, scientists agree that all non-avian dinosaurs became extinct at the K–Pg boundary. The dinosaur fossil record has been interpreted to show both a decline in diversity and no decline in diversity during the last few million years of the Cretaceous, and it may be that the quality of the dinosaur fossil record is simply not good enough to permit researchers to distinguish between the options. There is no evidence that late Maastrichtian non-avian dinosaurs could burrow, swim, or dive, which suggests they were unable to shelter themselves from the worst parts of any environmental stress that occurred at the K–Pg boundary. It is possible that small dinosaurs (other than birds) did survive, but they would have been deprived of food, as herbivorous dinosaurs would have found plant material scarce and carnivores would have quickly found prey in short supply.

The growing consensus about the endothermy of dinosaurs (see dinosaur physiology) helps to understand their full extinction in contrast with their close relatives, the crocodilians. Ectothermic ("cold-blooded") crocodiles have very limited needs for food (they can survive several months without eating), while endothermic ("warm-blooded") animals of similar size need much more food to sustain their faster metabolism. Thus, under the circumstances of food chain disruption previously mentioned, non-avian dinosaurs died out, while some crocodiles survived. In this context, the survival of other endothermic animals, such as some birds and mammals, could be due, among other reasons, to their smaller needs for food, related to their small size at the extinction epoch.

Whether the extinction occurred gradually or suddenly has been debated, as both views have support from the fossil record. A study of 29 fossil sites in Catalan Pyrenees of Europe in 2010 supports the view that dinosaurs there had great diversity until the asteroid impact, with more than 100 living species. More recent research indicates that this figure is obscured by taphonomic biases and the sparsity of the continental fossil record. The results of this study, which were based on estimated real global biodiversity, showed that between 628 and 1,078 non-avian dinosaur species were alive at the end of the Cretaceous and underwent sudden extinction after the Cretaceous–Paleogene extinction event. Alternatively, interpretation based on the fossil-bearing rocks along the Red Deer River in Alberta, Canada, supports the gradual extinction of non-avian dinosaurs; during the last 10 million years of the Cretaceous layers there, the number of dinosaur species seems to have decreased from about 45 to approximately 12. Other scientists have made the same assessment following their research.

Several researchers support the existence of Paleocene non-avian dinosaurs. If their existence past the K–Pg boundary can be confirmed, these hadrosaurids would be considered a dead clade walking. The scientific consensus is that these fossils were eroded from their original locations and then re-buried in much later sediments (also known as reworked fossils).

Choristodere
The choristoderes (semi-aquatic archosauromorphs) survived across the K–Pg boundary but would die out in the early Miocene. Studies on Champsosaurus palatal teeth suggest that there were dietary changes among the various species across the K–Pg event.

Mammals 
All major Cretaceous mammalian lineages, including monotremes (egg-laying mammals), multituberculates, metatherians, eutherians, dryolestoideans, and gondwanatheres survived the K–Pg extinction event, although they suffered losses. In particular, metatherians largely disappeared from North America, and the Asian deltatheroidans became extinct (aside from the lineage leading to Gurbanodelta). In the Hell Creek beds of North America, at least half of the ten known multituberculate species and all eleven metatherians species are not found above the boundary. Multituberculates in Europe and North America survived relatively unscathed and quickly bounced back in the Paleocene, but Asian forms were devastated, never again to represent a significant component of mammalian fauna. A recent study indicates that metatherians suffered the heaviest losses at the K–Pg event, followed by multituberculates, while eutherians recovered the quickest.

Mammalian species began diversifying approximately 30 million years prior to the K–Pg boundary. Diversification of mammals stalled across the boundary.
Current research indicates that mammals did not explosively diversify across the K–Pg boundary, despite the ecological niches made available by the extinction of dinosaurs. Several mammalian orders have been interpreted as diversifying immediately after the K–Pg boundary, including Chiroptera (bats) and Cetartiodactyla (a diverse group that today includes whales and dolphins and even-toed ungulates), although recent research concludes that only marsupial orders diversified soon after the K–Pg boundary.

K–Pg boundary mammalian species were generally small, comparable in size to rats; this small size would have helped them find shelter in protected environments. It is postulated that some early monotremes, marsupials, and placentals were semiaquatic or burrowing, as there are multiple mammalian lineages with such habits today. Any burrowing or semiaquatic mammal would have had additional protection from K–Pg boundary environmental stresses.

Evidence

North American fossils 

In North American terrestrial sequences, the extinction event is best represented by the marked discrepancy between the rich and relatively abundant late-Maastrichtian pollen record and the post-boundary fern spike. A highly informative sequence of dinosaur-bearing rocks from the K–Pg boundary is found in western North America, particularly the late Maastrichtian-age Hell Creek Formation of Montana. Comparison with the older Judith River Formation (Montana) and Dinosaur Park Formation (Alberta), which both date from approximately 75 Ma, provides information on the changes in dinosaur populations over the last 10 million years of the Cretaceous. These fossil beds are geographically limited, covering only part of one continent.

The middle–late Campanian formations show a greater diversity of dinosaurs than any other single group of rocks. The late Maastrichtian rocks contain the largest members of several major clades: Tyrannosaurus, Ankylosaurus, Pachycephalosaurus, Triceratops, and Torosaurus,  which suggests food was plentiful immediately prior to the extinction.

Plant fossils illustrate the reduction in plant species across the K–Pg boundary. In the sediments below the K–Pg boundary the dominant plant remains are angiosperm pollen grains, but the boundary layer contains little pollen and is dominated by fern spores. More usual pollen levels gradually resume above the boundary layer. This is reminiscent of areas blighted by modern volcanic eruptions, where the recovery is led by ferns, which are later replaced by larger angiosperm plants. A study of ossilized fish bones found at Tanis in North Dakota suggests that the Cretaceous-Paleogene mass extinction happened during the Northern Hemisphere spring.

Marine fossils 
The mass extinction of marine plankton appears to have been abrupt and right at the K–Pg boundary. Ammonite genera became extinct at or near the K–Pg boundary; there was a smaller and slower extinction of ammonite genera prior to the boundary associated with a late Cretaceous marine regression. The gradual extinction of most inoceramid bivalves began well before the K–Pg boundary, and a small, gradual reduction in ammonite diversity occurred throughout the very late Cretaceous.

Further analysis shows that several processes were in progress in the late Cretaceous seas and partially overlapped in time, then ended with the abrupt mass extinction. The diversity of marine life decreased when the climate near the K–Pg boundary increased in temperature. The temperature increased about three to four degrees very rapidly between 65.4 and 65.2 million years ago, which is very near the time of the extinction event. Not only did the climate temperature increase, but the water temperature decreased, causing a drastic decrease in marine diversity.

Megatsunamis 

The scientific consensus is that the asteroid impact at the K–Pg boundary left megatsunami deposits and sediments around the area of the Caribbean Sea and Gulf of Mexico, from the colossal waves created by the impact.

Fossils in sedimentary rocks deposited during the impact
Fossiliferous sedimentary rocks deposited during the K–Pg impact have been found in the Gulf of Mexico area, including tsunami wash deposits carrying remains of a mangrove-type ecosystem, evidence that after the impact water sloshed back and forth repeatedly in the Gulf of Mexico, and dead fish left in shallow water but not disturbed by scavengers.

Duration 
The rapidity of the extinction is a controversial issue, because some theories about its causes imply a rapid extinction over a relatively short period (from a few years to a few thousand years), while others imply longer periods. The issue is difficult to resolve because of the Signor–Lipps effect, where the fossil record is so incomplete that most extinct species probably died out long after the most recent fossil that has been found. Scientists have also found very few continuous beds of fossil-bearing rock that cover a time range from several million years before the K–Pg extinction to several million years after it. 

The sedimentation rate and thickness of K–Pg clay from three sites suggest rapid extinction, perhaps over a period of less than 10,000 years. At one site in the Denver Basin of Colorado, after the K–Pg boundary layer was deposited, the fern spike lasted approximately 1,000 years, and no more than 71,000 years; at the same location, the earliest appearance of Cenozoic mammals occurred after approximately 185,000 years, and no more than 570,000 years, "indicating rapid rates of biotic extinction and initial recovery in the Denver Basin during this event." Models presented at the annual meeting of the American Geophysical Union demonstrated that the period of global darkness following the Chicxulub impact would have persisted in the Hell Creek Formation nearly 2 years.

Chicxulub impact

Evidence for impact 

In 1980, a team of researchers consisting of Nobel Prize-winning physicist Luis Alvarez, his son, geologist Walter Alvarez, and chemists Frank Asaro and Helen Michel discovered that sedimentary layers found all over the world at the Cretaceous–Paleogene boundary contain a concentration of iridium many times greater than normal (30, 160, and 20 times in three sections originally studied). Iridium is extremely rare in Earth's crust because it is a siderophile element which mostly sank along with iron into Earth's core during planetary differentiation. As iridium remains more abundant in most asteroids and comets, the Alvarez team suggested that an asteroid struck the Earth at the time of the K–Pg boundary. There were earlier speculations on the possibility of an impact event, but this was the first hard evidence.

This hypothesis was viewed as radical when first proposed, but additional evidence soon emerged. The boundary clay was found to be full of minute spherules of rock, crystallized from droplets of molten rock formed by the impact. Shocked quartz and other minerals were also identified in the K–Pg boundary. The identification of giant tsunami beds along the Gulf Coast and the Caribbean provided more evidence, and suggested that the impact may have occurred nearby—as did the discovery that the K–Pg boundary became thicker in the southern United States, with meter-thick beds of debris occurring in northern New Mexico.

Further research identified the giant Chicxulub crater, buried under Chicxulub on the coast of Yucatán, as the source of the K–Pg boundary clay.

In a 2013 paper, Paul Renne of the Berkeley Geochronology Center dated the impact at  years ago, based on argon–argon dating. He further posits that the mass extinction occurred within 32,000 years of this date.

In 2007, it was proposed that the impactor belonged to the Baptistina family of asteroids. This link has been doubted, though not disproved, in part because of a lack of observations of the asteroid and its family. It was reported in 2009 that 298 Baptistina does not share the chemical signature of the K–Pg impactor. Further, a 2011 Wide-field Infrared Survey Explorer (WISE) study of reflected light from the asteroids of the family estimated their break-up at 80 Ma, giving them insufficient time to shift orbits and impact Earth by 66 Ma.

Additional evidence for the impact event is found at the Tanis site in southwestern North Dakota, United States. Tanis is part of the heavily studied Hell Creek Formation, a group of rocks spanning four states in North America renowned for many significant fossil discoveries from the Upper Cretaceous and lower Paleocene. Tanis is an extraordinary and unique site because it appears to record the events from the first minutes until a few hours after the impact of the giant Chicxulub asteroid in extreme detail. Amber from the site has been reported to contain microtektites matching those of the Chicxulub impact event.  Some researchers question the interpretation of the findings at the site or are skeptical of the team leader, Robert DePalma, who had not yet received his Ph.D. in geology at the time of the discovery and whose commercial activities have been regarded with suspicion.

Effects of impact 

In March 2010, an international panel of 41 scientists reviewed 20 years of scientific literature and endorsed the asteroid hypothesis, specifically the Chicxulub impact, as the cause of the extinction, ruling out other theories such as massive volcanism. They had determined that a  asteroid hurtled into Earth at Chicxulub on Mexico's Yucatán Peninsula. The collision would have released the same energy as —more than a billion times the energy of the atomic bombings of Hiroshima and Nagasaki. The Chicxulub impact caused a global catastrophe. Some of the phenomena were brief occurrences immediately following the impact, but there were also long-term geochemical and climatic disruptions that devastated the ecology.

The re-entry of ejecta into Earth's atmosphere included a brief (hours-long) but intense pulse of infrared radiation, cooking exposed organisms. This is debated, with opponents arguing that local ferocious fires, probably limited to North America, fall short of global firestorms. This is the "Cretaceous–Paleogene firestorm debate". A paper in 2013 by a prominent modeler of nuclear winter suggested that, based on the amount of soot in the global debris layer, the entire terrestrial biosphere might have burned, implying a global soot-cloud blocking out the sun and creating an impact winter effect. If widespread fires occurred this would have exterminated the most vulnerable organisms that survived the period immediately after the impact.

Aside from the hypothesized fire and/or impact winter effects, the impact would have created a dust cloud that blocked sunlight for up to a year, inhibiting photosynthesis. Freezing temperatures probably lasted for at least three years. It would take at least ten years for such aerosols to dissipate, and would account for the extinction of plants and phytoplankton, and subsequently herbivores and their predators. Creatures whose food chains were based on detritus would have a reasonable chance of survival. 

The asteroid hit an area of carbonate rock containing a large amount of combustible hydrocarbons and sulphur, much of which was vaporized, thereby injecting sulfuric acid aerosols into the stratosphere, which might have reduced sunlight reaching the Earth's surface by more than 50%, and would have caused acid rain. The resulting acidification of the oceans would kill many organisms that grow shells of calcium carbonate. According to models of the Hell Creek Formation, the onset of global darkness would have reached its maximum in only a few weeks and likely lasted upwards of 2 years. 

Beyond extinction impacts, the event also caused more general changes of flora and fauna such as giving rise to neotropical rainforest biomes like the Amazonia, replacing species composition and structure of local forests during ~6 million years of recovery to former levels of plant diversity.

2016 Chicxulub crater drilling project

In 2016, a scientific drilling project obtained deep rock-core samples from the peak ring around the Chicxulub impact crater. The discoveries confirmed that the rock comprising the peak ring had been shocked by immense pressure and melted in just minutes from its usual state into its present form. Unlike sea-floor deposits, the peak ring was made of granite originating much deeper in the earth, which had been ejected to the surface by the impact. Gypsum is a sulfate-containing rock usually present in the shallow seabed of the region; it had been almost entirely removed, vaporized into the atmosphere. Further, the event was immediately followed by a megatsunami sufficient to lay down the largest known layer of sand separated by grain size directly above the peak ring. The impactor was large enough to create a  peak ring, to melt, shock, and eject deep granite, to create colossal water movements, and to eject an immense quantity of vaporized rock and sulfates into the atmosphere, where they would have persisted for several years. This worldwide dispersal of dust and sulfates would have affected climate catastrophically, led to large temperature drops, and devastated the food chain.

Alternative hypotheses 
Although the concurrence of the end-Cretaceous extinctions with the Chicxulub asteroid impact strongly supports the impact hypothesis, some scientists continue to support other contributing causes: volcanic eruptions, climate change, sea level change, and other impact events. The end-Cretaceous event is the only mass extinction known to be associated with an impact, and other large impacts, such as the Manicouagan Reservoir impact, do not coincide with any noticeable extinction events.

Deccan Traps 

Before 2000, arguments that the Deccan Traps flood basalts caused the extinction were usually linked to the view that the extinction was gradual, as the flood basalt events were thought to have started around 68 Mya and lasted more than 2 million years. The most recent evidence shows that the traps erupted over a period of only 800,000 years spanning the K–Pg boundary, and therefore may be responsible for the extinction and the delayed biotic recovery thereafter.

The Deccan Traps could have caused extinction through several mechanisms, including the release of dust and sulfuric aerosols into the air, which might have blocked sunlight and thereby reduced photosynthesis in plants. In addition, Deccan Trap volcanism might have resulted in carbon dioxide emissions that increased the greenhouse effect when the dust and aerosols cleared from the atmosphere. The increased carbon dioxide emissions also caused acid rain, evidenced by increased mercury deposition due to increased solubility of mercury compounds in more acidic water.

In the years when the Deccan Traps hypothesis was linked to a slower extinction, Luis Alvarez (d. 1988) replied that paleontologists were being misled by sparse data. While his assertion was not initially well-received, later intensive field studies of fossil beds lent weight to his claim. Eventually, most paleontologists began to accept the idea that the mass extinctions at the end of the Cretaceous were largely or at least partly due to a massive Earth impact. Even Walter Alvarez acknowledged that other major changes may have contributed to the extinctions.

Combining these theories, some geophysical models suggest that the impact contributed to the Deccan Traps.
These models, combined with high-precision radiometric dating, suggest that the Chicxulub impact could have triggered some of the largest Deccan eruptions, as well as eruptions at active volcanoes anywhere on Earth.

Multiple impact event 
Other crater-like topographic features have also been proposed as impact craters formed in connection with Cretaceous–Paleogene extinction. This suggests the possibility of near-simultaneous multiple impacts, perhaps from a fragmented asteroidal object similar to the Shoemaker–Levy 9 impact with Jupiter. In addition to the  Chicxulub crater, there is the  Boltysh crater in Ukraine, the  Silverpit crater in the North Sea possibly formed by bolide impact, and the controversial and much larger  Shiva crater. Any other craters that might have formed in the Tethys Ocean would since have been obscured by the northward tectonic drift of Africa and India.

Maastrichtian sea-level regression 
There is clear evidence that sea levels fell in the final stage of the Cretaceous by more than at any other time in the Mesozoic era. In some Maastrichtian stage rock layers from various parts of the world, the later layers are terrestrial; earlier layers represent shorelines and the earliest layers represent seabeds. These layers do not show the tilting and distortion associated with mountain building, therefore the likeliest explanation is a regression, a drop in sea level. There is no direct evidence for the cause of the regression, but the currently accepted explanation is that the mid-ocean ridges became less active and sank under their own weight.

A severe regression would have greatly reduced the continental shelf area, the most species-rich part of the sea, and therefore could have been enough to cause a marine mass extinction, but this change would not have caused the extinction of the ammonites. The regression would also have caused climate changes, partly by disrupting winds and ocean currents and partly by reducing the Earth's albedo and increasing global temperatures.

Marine regression also resulted in the loss of epeiric seas, such as the Western Interior Seaway of North America. The loss of these seas greatly altered habitats, removing coastal plains that ten million years before had been host to diverse communities such as are found in rocks of the Dinosaur Park Formation. Another consequence was an expansion of freshwater environments, since continental runoff now had longer distances to travel before reaching oceans. While this change was favorable to freshwater vertebrates, those that prefer marine environments, such as sharks, suffered.

Multiple causes 
Proponents of multiple causation view the suggested single causes as either too small to produce the vast scale of the extinction, or not likely to produce its observed taxonomic pattern. In a review article, J. David Archibald and David E. Fastovsky discussed a scenario combining three major postulated causes: volcanism, marine regression, and extraterrestrial impact. In this scenario, terrestrial and marine communities were stressed by the changes in, and loss of, habitats. Dinosaurs, as the largest vertebrates, were the first affected by environmental changes, and their diversity declined. At the same time, particulate materials from volcanism cooled and dried areas of the globe. Then an impact event occurred, causing collapses in photosynthesis-based food chains, both in the already-stressed terrestrial food chains and in the marine food chains.

Based on studies at Seymour Island in Antarctica, Sierra Petersen and colleagues argue that there were two separate extinction events near the Cretaceous–Paleogene boundary, with one correlating to Deccan Trap volcanism and one correlated with the Chicxulub impact. The team analyzed combined extinction patterns using a new clumped isotope temperature record from a hiatus-free, expanded K–Pg boundary section. They documented a 7.8±3.3 °C warming synchronous with the onset of Deccan Traps volcanism and a second, smaller warming at the time of meteorite impact. They suggest local warming may have been amplified due to the simultaneous disappearance of continental or sea ice. Intra-shell variability indicates a possible reduction in seasonality after Deccan eruptions began, continuing through the meteorite event. Species extinction at Seymour Island occurred in two pulses that coincide with the two observed warming events, directly linking the end-Cretaceous extinction at this site to both volcanic and meteorite events via climate change.

Recovery and diversification 

The K–Pg extinction had a profound effect on the evolution of life on Earth. The elimination of dominant Cretaceous groups allowed other organisms to take their place, causing a remarkable amount of species diversification during the Paleogene Period. The most striking example is the replacement of dinosaurs by mammals. After the K–Pg extinction, mammals evolved rapidly to fill the niches left vacant by the dinosaurs. Also significant, within the mammalian genera, new species were approximately 9.1% larger after the K–Pg boundary.

Other groups also substantially diversified. Based on molecular sequencing and fossil dating, many species of birds (the Neoaves group in particular) appeared to radiate after the K–Pg boundary. They even produced giant, flightless forms, such as the herbivorous Gastornis and Dromornithidae, and the predatory Phorusrhacidae. The extinction of Cretaceous lizards and snakes may have led to the evolution of modern groups such as iguanas, monitor lizards, and boas. The diversification of crown group snakes has been linked to the iotic recovery in the aftermath of the K-Pg extinction event. On land, giant boid and enormous madtsoiid snakes appeared, and in the seas, giant sea snakes evolved. Teleost fish diversified explosively, filling the niches left vacant by the extinction. Groups appearing in the Paleocene and Eocene epochs include billfish, tunas, eels, and flatfish. Major changes are also seen in Paleogene insect communities. Many groups of ants were present in the Cretaceous, but in the Eocene ants became dominant and diverse, with larger colonies. Butterflies diversified as well, perhaps to take the place of leaf-eating insects wiped out by the extinction. The advanced mound-building termites, Termitidae, also appear to have risen in importance.

It is thought that body sizes of placental mammalian survivors evolutionarily increased first, allowing them to fill niches after the extinctions, with brain sizes increasing later in the Eocene.

Evidence from the Salamanca Formation suggests that biotic recovery was more rapid in the Southern Hemisphere than in the Northern Hemisphere.

See also 

 Climate across Cretaceous–Paleogene boundary
 Late Devonian extinction
 List of possible impact structures on Earth
 Late Ordovician mass extinction
 Permian–Triassic extinction event
 Timeline of Cretaceous–Paleogene extinction event research
 Triassic–Jurassic extinction event

Explanatory notes

Citations

Further reading 

 
 
 
 Papers and presentations resulting from the 2016 Chicxulub drilling project—The Geological Society of America, GSA Annual Meeting in Seattle, Washington, USA - 2017, Session No. 192

External links 

 What killed the dinosaurs?—University of California Museum of Paleontology (1995)
 The Great Chicxulub Debate 2004—Geological Society of London

 

Cenozoic volcanism
Events in the geological history of Earth
Events that forced the climate
Evolution of mammals
Hypothetical impact events
Megatsunamis
Mesozoic volcanism
Meteorological hypotheses
Prehistoric dinosaurs